The Bahraini King's Cup is a cup competition involving teams from the Bahraini Premier League and 2nd tier. The 2009 edition was played at the end of the domestic season, but this year it has been moved forward to start in mid-season.

Al Ahli were banned by the Bahrain Football Association this season after the team pulled out of last year's Crown Prince Cup semi-final match against Riffa.

The 2010 edition is the 54th to be held.

First round

The first round of the competition involves four teams from the 2nd tier league.

|colspan="3" style="background-color:#99CCCC"|13 December 2009

|-
|colspan="3" style="background-color:#99CCCC"|14 December 2009

|}

Round 2

|colspan="3" style="background-color:#99CCCC"|31 December 2009

|-
|colspan="3" style="background-color:#99CCCC"|1 January 2010

|-
|colspan="3" style="background-color:#99CCCC"|2 January 2010

|-
|colspan="3" style="background-color:#99CCCC"|3 January 2010

|}

Quarter finals

|colspan="3" style="background-color:#99CCCC"|12 January 2010

|-
|colspan="3" style="background-color:#99CCCC"|13 January 2010

|-
|colspan="3" style="background-color:#99CCCC"|14 January 2010

|-
|colspan="3" style="background-color:#99CCCC"|15 January 2010

|}

Semi  finals

|colspan="3" style="background-color:#99CCCC"|25 January 2010

|-
|colspan="3" style="background-color:#99CCCC"|26 January 2010

|-
|}

Final

References

Bahraini King's Cup seasons
King's Cup
Bahrain